The Waikiki Village Motel is a historic motel at 1500 South Ocean Boulevard in Myrtle Beach, South Carolina.  It was built in 1963, during the height of the resort community's boom years.  It is an idiosyncratic example of Mid-Century Modern architecture, with a distinctive Hawaiian style hut at one corner.  These types of decorative features were fairly common at the time, but many have succumbed to redevelopment.

The motel was listed on the National Register of Historic Places in 2017.

See also
 National Register of Historic Places listings in Horry County, South Carolina

References

Hotel buildings on the National Register of Historic Places in South Carolina
Hotel buildings completed in 1963
Hotels established in 1963
Buildings and structures in Myrtle Beach, South Carolina
1963 establishments in South Carolina
National Register of Historic Places in Horry County, South Carolina
Motels in the United States